The South Africa national cricket team toured the West Indies in April 1992. The tour marked the first-ever official Test and One Day International matches between the two teams. It was also South Africa's first Test match since their reintroduction to the sport after being suspended in 1970 due to the apartheid regime, and their first Test against a non-white team.

The tour consisted of three One-day Internationals and one Test match against the West Indies. All four matches were won by the West Indies.

Squads

Match details

1st ODI: West Indies v South Africa at Kingston, 7 April 1992

2nd ODI: West Indies v South Africa at Port-of-Spain, 11 April 1992

3rd ODI: West Indies v South Africa at Port-of-Spain, 12 April 1992

Test Match

The Test match was South Africa's first since their return to international cricket, and so 10 players were making their Test match debuts (Kepler Wessels had previously played for Australia). For the West Indies, 3 players made their debuts — Jimmy Adams, David Williams and Kenny Benjamin. The selection of Benjamin in particular had been a contentious issue. The Barbados crowd had expected Anderson Cummins, a Barbadian and a local favourite, to make his debut in this match in front of his home fans. However, the West Indian selectors opted for Benjamin instead. As a result, many fans chose to boycott the match in protest.

South Africa won the toss and chose to bowl first. The West Indies had reached 219/3, but collapsed to 262 all out. Notable contributions came from Keith Arthurton (59), Desmond Haynes (58) and Richie Richardson (44), and Richard Snell picked up 4 wickets for South Africa.

South Africa batted throughout the whole of the second day and into the third, racking up a score of 345 all out. A century from Andrew Hudson (163) formed the backbone of the innings with some support from Kepler Wessels (59). Debutant Jimmy Adams used his part-time spin bowling to pick up 4 wickets.

In their second innings, the West Indies scored 283 all out with help from Brian Lara (64) and Jimmy Adams (79*). Allan Donald and Richard Snell took 4 wickets each. This left South Africa requiring 201 runs for victory.

After the loss of two early wickets to Curtly Ambrose, half-centuries from Kepler Wessels (74) and Peter Kirsten (52) steadied the South African innings. However, after Wessels' dismissal to Courtney Walsh, South Africa collapsed from 123/2 to 148 all out as Ambrose (6 wickets) and Walsh (4 wickets) demolished the rest of the batting line-up. Four players were out for ducks, and after Wessels and Kirsten, the next highest score was only 4.

Curtly Ambrose and Andrew Hudson were jointly named Men of the Match — Ambrose for his match-winning spell of 6/34 and Hudson for his 163.

Notes
 Playfair Cricket Annual
 Wisden Cricketers Almanack (annual)

References

External sources
Cricinfo
CricketArchive

1992 in South African cricket
1992 in West Indian cricket
1992
West Indian cricket seasons from 1970–71 to 1999–2000
International cricket competitions from 1991–92 to 1994